Lux Summer Theatre is a CBS Radio (Columbia Broadcasting System) anthology series which ran during the summer of 1953 in the Lux Radio Theatre's regular one-hour timeslot. Fourteen episodes aired from June through August of that year. 

This weekly series differed from its parent show in several ways, starting with it being the first version of Lux Radio Theatre since 1936 to air during the summer. Norman Macdonnell was brought in from the Gunsmoke radio series to take on the job of director-producer. Ken Carpenter continued as the show's announcer, with Don Wilson filling in for him when on vacation. This summer series had a significantly smaller budget than its parent show, with each episode budgeted at $4250 (by contrast, when Lux Radio Theatre aired its first show from Hollywood in 1936 that show's budget was a reported $17,000). Because of the budget constraints, only a single major star headed-up each episode of the summer series.

Another difference involved the source materials which were used for the series. While about half of the shows were still the traditional movie adaptations, the series also presented several original scripts, with three of them written by Kathleen Hite. In addition, one program was an adaptation of Daphne du Maurier's horror story "The Birds".

As with its parent show, the series was broadcast live, but this series was a CBS studio broadcast, as opposed to its having previously been performed in the CBS Radio Playhouse theater on Vine Street in Hollywood.

Summer 1953

References 

1953 radio programme debuts
1953 radio programme endings
1950s American radio programs
Anthology radio series
CBS Radio programs